Stephen Milosavljevic (born 22 September 1993) is a French professional footballer who plays as a goalkeeper for FC Bastia-Borgo. He is of Serbian descent.

Born in Mulhouse, Milosavljevic started playing at Châteauroux where, after playing in the youth team, he became part of the main team in the season 2010–11. In the season 2011–12 he had a spell in Serbia with lower-league side FK Bane playing in the Serbian League West. Then he returned to Châteauroux where he played until the winter-break of 2014–15 when he moved to Le Havre.

References

Living people
1993 births
Footballers from Mulhouse
Association football goalkeepers
French footballers
French people of Serbian descent
Ligue 2 players
Le Havre AC players
FK Bane players
FC Mulhouse players
FC Bastia-Borgo players
Expatriate footballers in Serbia
LB Châteauroux players